was the Japanese ambassador to the United States from 1934 till his death in 1939.

As an envoy, Saito took part in Japan's 1934 renunciation of the Washington Naval Treaty. Saito worked to maintain good relations with the U.S, even as further global condemnation for the Japanese invasion of Manchuria was mounting. Among the notable issues that he faced was the USS Panay incident.

Personal life 

Hiroshi Saitō was born into a powerful and wealthy family in 1886. At age 32 he returned to Japan from the U.S to marry Miyoko Nagayo, daughter of Baron Sensai Nagayo, a diplomat in the Iwakura Mission. They had two daughters, Sakiko Saitō born in 1927 and Makako Saitō, born in 1930.

He died from tuberculosis in February 1939, in Washington D.C.. Upon his death, his body was returned to Japan via the heavy cruiser USS Astoria under the command of Captain Richmond K. Turner.

References

External links 
 Video of Saito addressing the US on matters of a naval treaty

1886 births
1939 deaths
Ambassadors of Japan to the United States
Consuls General of Japan in New York